Robert Safranek from the Benevue, Inc., Warren, New Jersey, was named Fellow of the Institute of Electrical and Electronics Engineers (IEEE) in 2015 for contributions to perceptual image and video compression and quality.

References

Fellow Members of the IEEE
Living people
21st-century American engineers
Year of birth missing (living people)
Place of birth missing (living people)
American electrical engineers